The New Despotism is a book written by the Lord Hewart, Lord Chief Justice of England, and published in 1929 by Ernest Benn Limited. Hewart described this "new despotism" as "to subordinate Parliament, to evade the Courts, and to render the will, or the caprice, of the Executive unfettered and supreme".  The evasion of the Courts referred to increasing quasi-judicial decision-making by the civil service and the subordination of Parliament which resulted from the growth of delegated legislation.

Contents
I. The Nature of the QuestionII. The Rule of LawIII. "Administrative Law"IV. Administrative LawlessnessV. The System at WorkVI. Departmental LegislationVII. The Independence of the JudiciaryVIII. What is to be done?IX. Some leading casesX. Examples from statutes

Reaction

The book created "a constitutional and political storm". It was rumoured that Whitehall "considered an attempt to boycott it". In response the British Government appointed the Donoughmore Committee (chaired by Lord Donoughmore) to review the powers of Ministers, however its Report (1932; Cmd. 4060) did not share Hewart's alarm.

The book and the Donoughmore Report provoked a group of socialist lawyers and political scientists, notably Professor Harold Laski (a member of the Donoughmore Committee) and  Ivor Jennings to criticise the Diceyan concept of the rule of law.

In 1956, Richard Crossman published a Fabian Society tract titled Socialism and the New Despotism where he hoped reform of the judiciary would make the judiciary "regain the traditional function of defending individual rights against encroachment".

The book was a favourite of Margaret Thatcher's.

Notes

1929 non-fiction books
Ernest Benn Limited books